Mark J. Newton and Peter Truong are two convicted child sexual abusers arrested in Los Angeles in 2013. Truong, a Vietnamese-Australian, and Newton, from the United States, entered a civil partnership in Australia, adopted a boy from Russia in 2005 and paid his mother $8,000 for him. The pair groomed the boy for sexual abuse and flew him around the world for other men to abuse, having visited many countries by the time he was three years old. Before their crime came to light, Newton and Truong were featured in several TV programs and magazine articles about LGBT families, including a notorious interview by Australian journalist Ginger Gorman in June 2010.

The crime was accidentally revealed when police found videos of the child, identified by a distinctive henna tattoo on his chest, being abused by Newton, Truong, and others. The two were also found to be part of an international pedophile ring. In June 2013, Newton was sentenced to a 40-year prison time and in December, Truong was sentenced to 30 years, after having his sentence reduced 10 years for cooperating with the investigators. The case of Newton and Truong was influential in persuading the Russian Federation to prohibit adoption by homosexual couples.

References 

American people convicted of child sexual abuse
Australian people convicted of child sexual abuse
Living people
Same-sex couples
Year of birth missing (living people)